Mosser Glass is a company making handmade glass, founded in Cambridge, Ohio, in 1970 by Thomas R. Mosser. The company is operated by his oldest son, Tim Mosser. The Mosser family got their start in the business at the Cambridge Glass Company.

The company offers tours of its facilities.

References

External links
 Mosser Glass Company website

Glassmaking companies of the United States
Manufacturing companies based in Ohio
American companies established in 1970
Manufacturing companies established in 1970
1969 establishments in Ohio
Tourist attractions in Ohio